A duda is a Hungarian bagpipe.

Duda may also refer to:

Places
Duda, a village in Subcetate Commune, Harghita County, Romania
Duda, a village in Duda-Epureni Commune, Vaslui County, Romania
 Duda Mică River, Romania
 Duda Mare River, Romania

People
Duda (name), including a list of people with the name
Dūda (surname), including a list of people with the name

Mononyms
Duda (footballer, born 1968), born Edmilton Conceição dos Santos, Brazilian forward
Duda (footballer, born 1974), born Carlos Eduardo Ventura, Brazilian football forward
Duda (footballer, born 1980), born Sérgio Paulo Barbosa Valente, Portuguese football midfielder
Duda (footballer, born 1988), born Carlos Eduardo Schneider, Brazilian football forward
Duda (footballer, born 1994), born Eduardo Haas Gehlen, Brazilian football defender
Duda Francelino (born 1995), born Maria Eduarda Francelino da Silva, Brazilian women's football forward
Eduarda Santos Lisboa (born 1998), nicknamed Duda, Brazilian beach volleyball player

Other uses
La duda, a telenovella broadcast in Mexico by the TV Azteca network
Dūda, a Latvian bowed string instrument
Dūdas, a Latvian brass/pipe instrument

See also 
 Doodah (disambiguation)
 Duda River (disambiguation)
 Dudda (disambiguation)